James Charles Tetteh (born March 22, 1990), known by his stage name Jay Hover, is a Ghanaian-American Afrobeats , Afropop and  Highlife singer, songwriter, and music producer, based in Worcester.

Early life
Jay Hover was born and raised at Bubuashie,  Accra in the Greater Accra Region of Ghana to a Ghanaian mother and father.He had his basic education at the Kaneshie Presby School and went on to Odorgonno Senior High. After completing his secondary education, he furthered at the University of Ghana, where he studied Music and Business Administration.

Music career
While growing up, Jay Hover developed an interest in music, listening to songs by legendary Ghanaian musicians, Ofori Amponsah, Daddy Lumba, Amakye Dede among others.
Jay Hover debuted in the music scene with his single "Ayele" which was released in 2017.
He signed his first major record deal in 2019 with Highly Spiritual Music founded by Ghanaian music producer and engineer Kaywa.  
In April 2022, he released the single "One Leg" which went viral on TikTok with over 113 million views and over 3.7 million views on YouTube, the song received much attention through social media platforms.

Discography 
 Major Singles
 Ayele ft. Bizzel
 Broken Heart 
 Give Me Money
 Cum Here Bad Gyal 
 Hater 
 Kokoni ft. Tizo
 Give Me Love ft. Mr Drew
 Fear No Evil
 My Baby
 Roses Are Red
 When
 Doezovoort ft Tizo
 Do Me 
 Buttocks
 Ashawo
 Wara ft Kwesoul
 Somu
 Case
 One Logo Logo Line 
 One Leg

Videography

Awards and nominations

Ghana Music Awards USA

Ghana Entertainment Awards USA

Ghana Nigeria Music Awards USA

References 

Ghanaian male singers
1990 births
Living people
University of Ghana alumni
Ghanaian American
Male singer-songwriters
21st-century Ghanaian male singers
Ghanaian male singer-songwriters
People from Greater Accra Region